The 2020–21 North Carolina Central Eagles men's basketball team represented North Carolina Central University in the 2020–21 NCAA Division I men's basketball season. The Eagles, led by 12th-year head coach LeVelle Moton, played their home games at McDougald–McLendon Arena in Durham, North Carolina as members of the Mid-Eastern Athletic Conference. With the creation of divisions to cut down on travel due to the COVID-19 pandemic, they played in the Southern Division.

Previous season
The Eagles finished the 2019–20 season 18–13, 13–3 in MEAC play to finish as MEAC regular season champions. They defeated Delaware State in the quarterfinals of the MEAC tournament. They were scheduled to play the winner of the quarterfinal matchup between Bethune–Cookman and Morgan State in the semifinals, but the remainder of the tournament was cancelled due to the ongoing COVID-19 pandemic.

Roster

Schedule and results 

|-
!colspan=12 style=| Regular season

|-
!colspan=12 style=| MEAC tournament
|-

|-

Sources

References

North Carolina Central Eagles men's basketball seasons
North Carolina Central Eagles
North Carolina Central Eagles men's basketball
North Carolina Central Eagles men's basketball